The Haldimand County Museum & Archives, located at 8 Echo Street in Cayuga, Ontario, Canada, is a museum that preserves and makes accessible evidence of the history of Haldimand County. Artifacts related to Haldimand County are restored and displayed in the museum galleries and grounds. The current curator is Karen Richardson.

Buildings, Facilities, and Exhibits
The museum houses two galleries; one exhibits Victorian parlour "customs and culture," "the busy routine of a pioneer kitchen," and the "tools of a 19th Century blacksmith's shop", while the second holds temporary exhibits . The museum grounds also house an 1835 "authentic log cabin" that was originally "located on the Old Plank Road near Caledonia, the cabin was once home to the Nicholas Family..." .

The archives research facility provides access to collections relevant to historians and genealogists interested in the county. Special events are held throughout the year.

Publications
The museum has published histories on specific aspects of county life, including:

Armstrong, Bonnie. Architecture of Haldimand County. Cayuga, Ontario: Haldimand County Museum, 1983.
Bacher, Christine, Christine Boyko, Holly Csorbay, Joelle Dosman. Folk Art of Haldimand County. Edited by Rene Tunney. Cayuga, Ontario: Haldimand County Museum, 1985.
Tunney, Rene. Cabinet Makers of Haldimand County: An Introduction and Inventory. Cayuga, Ontario: Haldimand County Museum, 1984.

Related Heritage and Culture Centres and Events
The Haldimand County Museum & Archives is one of three heritage facilities operated by the Heritage and Culture Division of the municipal government (Haldimand County); the other two are the Edinburgh Square Heritage and Culture Centre and the Wilson MacDonald Memorial School Museum. Ruthven Park National Historic Site (a National Historic Site of Canada) is located approximately 4 kilometres north of the Haldimand County Museum & Archives and another national historic site, Chiefswood, is located within the county boundaries, but on the Six Nations Reserve approximately 25 kilometres to the northwest. There are also privately operated cultural centres in the county: Cottonwood Mansion, Caledonia Grand Trunk Station, Caledonia Mill, and the No. 6 RCAF Museum Dunnville. The annual Caledonia Fair also exhibits historical artifacts and tableaux of early agrarian and industrial life in the county.

Affiliations
The Museum is affiliated with: CMA,  CHIN, and Virtual Museum of Canada.

References

External links
 

History museums in Ontario
Museums in Haldimand County
Archives in Ontario